The 1989 Saskatchewan Roughriders was the 75th season in the club's 79th year of existence. The team finished in 3rd place in the Canadian Football League's West Division with a 9–9 record. The Roughriders defeated the Calgary Stampeders in the West Semi-Final and then defeated the heavily-favoured Edmonton Eskimos who had finished with a CFL-record 16 regular season wins. Due to their West Final win, the Roughriders qualified for their first Grey Cup game since the club's loss in the 1976 championship game.

In the 77th Grey Cup, the team faced the 12–6 Hamilton Tiger-Cats who had already defeated the Roughriders in both regular season matches. However, the Roughriders kept it a close game and ultimately won with a Dave Ridgway field goal to win the championship. It was Saskatchewan's first Grey Cup win in 23 years (since the 1966 Grey Cup), and only their second in team history.

Offseason

CFL Draft

Preseason

Regular season

Standings

Schedule

Postseason

Schedule

Grey Cup

Grey Cup aftermath
For the Grey Cup celebrations, 18,000 fans showed up at Taylor Field, in minus 10 degree Celsius weather to welcome back the club. A few weeks later, it was revealed that the playoff run nearly bankrupted the team. Instead of a projected $85,000 profit, the Riders lost $195,000 due to the cost of the three road games. General Manager Al Ford declared that the team's debt increased to 1.6 million dollars.

Awards and honours
CFL's Coach of the Year, John Gregory
Grey Cup's Most Valuable Player, Offence: Kent Austin
Grey Cup's Most Valuable Player, Defence: Chuck Klingbeil
Grey Cup's Most Valuable Canadian, Dave Ridgway

1989 CFL All-Stars 
WR – Don Narcisse
LB – Eddie Lowe
K – Dave Ridgway

1989 Western All-Stars 
RB – Tim McCray
SB – Jeff Fairholm
WR – Don Narcisse
OG – Roger Aldag
DT – James Curry
DE – Bobby Jurasin
LB – Eddie Lowe
DS – Glen Suitor
K – Dave Ridgway

References

Saskatchewan Roughriders seasons
N. J. Taylor Trophy championship seasons
Grey Cup championship seasons
1989 Canadian Football League season by team